Detroit is a 2017 American period crime drama film directed by Kathryn Bigelow and written by Mark Boal. Based on the Algiers Motel incident during Detroit's 1967 12th Street Riot, the film's release commemorated the 50th anniversary of the event. The film stars an ensemble cast that includes John Boyega, Will Poulter, Algee Smith, Jacob Latimore, Jason Mitchell, Hannah Murray, Kaitlyn Dever, Jack Reynor, Ben O'Toole, Nathan Davis, Jr., Peyton Alex Smith, Malcolm David Kelley, Joseph David-Jones, with John Krasinski and Anthony Mackie.

Detroit premiered at the Fox Theatre, Detroit, on July 26, 2017, and began a limited theatrical release on July 28, 2017, while the wide expansion starting on August 4. The film received positive reviews from critics, with particular praise towards Bigelow's direction, Boal's screenplay and the performances of Boyega, Poulter, and Smith, but was a box office failure, only grossing $26 million against its $34 million budget.

Plot 
On July 23, 1967, the Detroit Police Department stage a raid on an unlicensed club. While suspects are being arrested, a crowd forms and starts throwing rocks at the officers before looting nearby stores and starting fires, beginning the 12th Street Riot. With state authorities, elected representatives and emergency services unable to maintain any semblance of order, the Michigan Army National Guard and Army paratroopers enter Detroit to provide assistance. On the second day of rioting, two cops pursue a fleeing looter. One of them, Philip Krauss, kills the man with a shotgun against orders but is allowed to remain on duty until his superiors can decide whether to file murder charges.

The Dramatics, a professional black R&B group, prepares for their scheduled performance at a music hall but the police shut down the venue and order them to leave the city. En route, their bus is attacked by rioters and the group splits up, with lead singer Larry Reed and his bodyguard Fred Temple renting a room at the local Algiers Motel for the night. They meet two white girls, Julie Ann Hysell and Karen Malloy, who introduce them to their friends Carl Cooper, Aubrey Pollard, Jr., Michael Clark and Lee Forsythe. Carl Cooper and another friend stage a prank using a starter pistol, upsetting Hysell and Malloy, who move to the room of Karl Greene, a Vietnam War veteran, while Reed and Temple return to their own room.

Melvin Dismukes, a private security guard, is assigned to protect a grocery store from looters. Cooper fires several blanks from his pistol in the direction of the troops to frighten them, but they mistake it for a sniper attack and pinpoint it coming from the Algiers. Led by Krauss, the Michigan State Police, National Guard and Detroit Police arrive at the motel to investigate. Entering the building, Krauss kills Cooper when he tries to escape and plants a knife next to his body.

The police round up everyone in the hotel and line them against the wall, demanding to know who the sniper was. Despite not finding any weapon during a search of the room, Krauss terrorizes and interrogates the occupants of the hotel. Dismukes arrives to try to help. Unwilling to get involved, most of the state police and National Guard leave without informing anyone of Krauss's abuse.

Krauss orders several suspects to be moved to different rooms and subjected to mock executions to terrify the others into confessing. One officer-Demens actually kills Pollard, as he did not understand that the executions were supposed to be faked. Hysell and Malloy are taken to an upstairs room. Disgusted, a Guardsman manages to get them released from custody. Fearing arrest, Krauss permits the remaining three men to leave but only if they swear to keep silent. Greene and Reed agree but Temple is shot twice in the chest by Krauss after he refuses.

As the riots die down, Dismukes is arrested and charged with murder after Hysell identifies him as being present at the Algiers that night. His fellow officers are questioned as well and when everyone except Krauss confesses, they are also charged. Reed, whose music career has stalled due to trauma, is summoned as a witness. The judge ultimately refuses to accept any of the confessions as evidence and without a solid case, the all-white jury acquits Dismukes and the co-defendants of all charges. Dismukes confronts the three officers but finds himself powerless to get any justice for the victims.

The film ends by explaining what became of the participants: Dismukes moved to the suburbs to escape death threats and resumed work as a security guard. Although Senak, August and Paille were found not guilty of criminal charges, they never returned to active duty. Paille died on September 9, 2011, while Senak and August were arrested and remain in prison. Years later, a civil court ruled against one of the officers and he was ordered to pay a fine to Pollard's family of $5,000. Temple's family sued the city of Detroit for wrongful death, but the city would not admit guilt. Cooper's starter pistol was never found. Hysell left Detroit, raised four children and now works as a hairdresser. The Dramatics broke out in the 1970s with several hits and continue to perform to this day. Reed never rejoined the band; he lives in Detroit and sings in a church choir.

Cast

Production

Development and casting
On January 28, 2016, it was announced that Kathryn Bigelow and Mark Boal would reteam to make a film about the 1967 Detroit riots, with Bigelow directing from a script by Boal. Both would also produce the film, along with Annapurna Pictures' Megan Ellison and Matthew Budman. Game of Thrones actress Hannah Murray was cast in a "key role" in the film, although her character was then being kept under wraps.

The film was scheduled to shoot in the summer of 2016, in order to be released in 2017 for the 50th anniversary of the riots. On June 21, 2016, John Boyega joined the cast. On August 3, 2016, Jack Reynor, Will Poulter, and Ben O'Toole were cast in lead roles. On August 4, 2016, Anthony Mackie joined the cast, and on August 5, 2016, Jacob Latimore and Algee Smith also joined.

On August 8, 2016, Joseph David-Jones joined the cast, followed by Kaitlyn Dever on August 30, 2016. On September 9, 2016, Jason Mitchell joined the cast, and on September 13, 2016, John Krasinski was also added. In October 2016, Jeremy Strong, Chris Chalk, Austin Hébert, Ephraim Sykes, Laz Alonso, Nathan Davis Jr., Malcolm David Kelley, Peyton Alex Smith, and Leon Thomas III all joined the cast of the film.

Filming
It was reported at the end of July 2016 that the film had commenced principal photography in Boston during the previous week. Scenes were filmed inside Dedham District Court, in Dorchester, Massachusetts and in Brockton, Massachusetts. In addition, the movie filmed in Detroit during October 2016. The elimination of Michigan's film incentives in 2015 affected the filming locations.

Bigelow fired Strong after the first day of shooting, believing his character did not work as expected. He was later recast as Lang.

Post-production
In May 2017, James Newton Howard was hired as the film's composer. In July 2017, Detroit rapper Tee Grizzley released a song called "Teetroit" for the soundtrack. The Roots and Bilal released a song named "It Ain't Fair" for the soundtrack.

Release
Detroit began a limited release in 10 markets on July 28, 2017, opening in New York City, Los Angeles, Chicago, Dallas, Washington D.C., Detroit, San Francisco, Houston, Atlanta, and Baltimore. Annapurna Pictures then released the film nationally, its first as a distributor, on August 4, 2017. Annapurna handled the film's North American distribution, while Metro-Goldwyn-Mayer and Entertainment One handled distribution for its international release. On November 3, 2017, it was announced the film would get a ten city, 20 screen re-release on December 1, 2017, in an effort to push its award campaign.

Reception

Box office
Detroit grossed $16.8 million in the United States and Canada and $7.3 million in other territories for a worldwide total of $24.1 million, against a production budget of $34 million.

In North America, Detroit grossed $350,190 in its limited opening from 20 theaters (an average of $17,510), finishing 16th at the box office. The film then had its wide expansion alongside Kidnap and The Dark Tower, and was initially projected to gross $10–15 million from 3,007 theaters over the weekend. The film made $525,000 from Thursday previews, which was more than the $515,482 it made in its entire week of limited release. It then made $2.6 million on its first day, lowering weekend projections to $7.5 million.

It went on to open to $7.1 million, finishing eighth at the box office; 40% of its opening weekend audience were African American. Deadline Hollywood wrote that the film could have done better had it been released in the fall during festivals and awards season. In its second weekend the film grossed $2.9 million, dropping 59.5% (above average for an adult drama) and finishing in 13th. In its third week of wide release the film was pulled from 1,579 theaters and grossed $850,000 (a drop of 70.9%).

Critical response
Detroit received praise for its direction, screenplay, and acting, especially Boyega, Poulter, and Smith's performances. On Rotten Tomatoes, the film has an approval rating of 82% based on 306 reviews, and an average rating of 7.60/10. The website's critical consensus reads, "Detroit delivers a gut-wrenching – and essential – dramatisation of a tragic chapter from America's past that draws distressing parallels to the present." On Metacritic, the film has a weighted average score of 77 out of 100, based on 49 critics, indicating "generally favorable reviews". Audiences polled by CinemaScore gave the film an average grade of "A−" on an A+ to F scale, and PostTrak reported film goers gave it an 86% overall positive score and a 63% "definite recommend".

Richard Roeper of the Chicago Sun-Times gave the film four out of four stars and called it one of 2017's best, saying: "Journalist-screenwriter Mark Boal (Bigelow's collaborator on The Hurt Locker and Zero Dark Thirty) does a magnificent job of juggling the multiple storylines and creating fully authentic characters—some flawed, some basically decent, some evil." Writing for Rolling Stone, Peter Travers praised the cast and script, giving the film three and a half out of four stars and saying, "... Detroit is far more than a liberal howl against the escalating toxicity of racism in America. Bigelow, with the same immersive intensity that Christopher Nolan brings to Dunkirk, smacks us down in the middle of a brutal historical event so we can see it – and feel it – for ourselves."

Conversely, Alexander Nazaryan of Newsweek wrote "[Bigelow's] characters never come alive, moving through the film less as people than entries in a sociology textbook ... If Bigelow could get inside the minds of soldiers suffocated by post-traumatic stress disorder, as she did so capably in The Hurt Locker, she can get into the mind of anyone. In Zero Dark Thirty, she made even CIA interrogators likeable. The characters in Detroit, though, black and white, are as flat as the plains of the Upper Midwest."

Several critics noted the film's questionable take on a predominantly African American-based story. A. O. Scott in The New York Times wrote "It is curious that a movie set against a backdrop of black resistance and rebellion—however inchoate and self-destructive its expression may have been—should become a tale of black helplessness and passivity. The white men, the decent ones as much as the brutes, have the answers, the power, the agency." K. Austin Collins of The Ringer wrote "This movie isn't really about black people as people, nor history as a lived experience, but is instead invested in a dutiful, 'just the facts, ma'am' reenactment that pretends those other things are already a given. Boal, and Bigelow beside him, refuse to speculate about — or imagine — the rest."

The New Yorkers Richard Brody called the film "a moral failure", saying: "[Bigelow's] intentions come through clearly: to depict an incident—and a climate—of racism, to show that the cruelty of these deeds was multiplied by their ultimate impunity, and to suggest that, in the intervening half-century since the events depicted in the film took place, little has changed. Movies aren’t made with intentions, though; they’re made with people and with equipment, and what Bigelow has her actors do for the benefit of the camera is repellent to imagine."

Accolades

Historical accuracy
According to Melvin Dismukes, who is depicted prominently in the film, Detroit "is 99.5% accurate as to what happened at the Algiers and in the city at the time." However, the Los Angeles Times wrote that "Bigelow does say there are moments of fiction, and Boal notes instances of 'pure screenwriting.' Some facts are contested within accounts; others were changed for the screen" and then raised the question "Does a disclaimer at the end sufficiently cover fictional manipulations in an ostensibly true story?"

Bigelow and Boal "changed names [of characters] so as to enjoy other creative liberties in the storytelling." One such subject whose name was dropped in favor of a fictional one is lawyer Norman Lippitt (played in the film by actor John Krasinski under the name Auerbach).

In response to the historical criticism, Boal said, "I employed poetic license, under a self-imposed rule to never stray from what I understood to be the underlying truth of a scene or an event. This script is built on a sturdy base of journalism and history, but it is not the same as journalism or history, nor does it aspire to be. As a screenwriter, I take the responsibility of being the creator of a tale, of transforming these raw materials into a drama."

See also
 List of black films of the 2010s

References

External links
 
 
 

2017 films
2017 crime drama films
American historical films
African-American biographical dramas
American crime drama films
Drama films based on actual events
Fictional portrayals of the Detroit Police Department
Films about police brutality
Films about race and ethnicity
Films about racism
Films set in 1967
Films set in 1969
Films set in Detroit
Films set in Michigan
Films set in motels
Films shot in Dedham, Massachusetts
Annapurna Pictures films
Films produced by Megan Ellison
Films directed by Kathryn Bigelow
Films scored by James Newton Howard
Metro-Goldwyn-Mayer films
Films with screenplays by Mark Boal
African-American films
Motown soundtracks
Films about police misconduct
Films shot in Detroit
Films shot in Michigan
Police brutality in the United States
2010s English-language films
2010s American films